Lyudmila Ivanovna Shchetinina  (born January 1, 1951) is a former Soviet volleyball player. She won a silver medal at the 1976 Summer Olympics.

References

Living people
1951 births
Soviet women's volleyball players
Volleyball players at the 1976 Summer Olympics
Olympic volleyball players of the Soviet Union
Olympic silver medalists for the Soviet Union
Olympic medalists in volleyball
Medalists at the 1976 Summer Olympics